The sixth cycle of Holland's Next Top Model (subtitled as Holland's Next Top Model Goes Europe) premiered on 26 August 2013  on RTL5. This was the first cycle of the series to be hosted by former model Anouk Smulders, replacing the show's previous host Daphne Deckers after three cycles. The judging panel was completely revamped as well, and featured no returning judges from any of the previous five cycles. The new vacancies on the judging panel were filled by editor-in-chief of Glamour magazine, Sabine Geurten, and fashion photographer Sharon Mor Yosef. Stylist Fred van Leer remained in place as a mentor for the contestants.

The prizes for this cycle included a modelling contract with Touché Models valued at €50,000, an additional contract with Next Model Management in London, a cover feature for Glamour magazine, a brand new car, and a paid business trip to Majorca to work with photographers and build a professional portfolio.

The winner of the competition was 18-year-old Nikki Steigenga from Rotterdam, South Holland.

Format changes
The new cycle incorporated several new changes to the show's format. In contrast to previous cycles, the contestants were housed in reduced accommodations, with the best performing models of each episode being granted access to a separate apartment from the losing contestants. This cycle also introduced a more randomized process of elimination without a linear call-out.

In addition to the 12 contestants chosen by the judges, the show also held a separate wildcard contest sponsored by Sizz to choose an additional 13th contestant. Daelorian van der Kolk and Michélle Wiegman	were eventually chosen from a shortlist of applicants to participate in the filming of the show's opening sequence and promotional photo shoot, though neither was featured in the cycle's first episode, and their identities remained unknown to the other contestants. Van der Kolk was chosen as the 13th finalist in episode 2.

This cycle placed a focus on developing models who could work internationally, and most of the filming took place outside of the Netherlands. The contestants were taken to several European cities, namely Copenhagen, Milan, Como, and London, in order to attend castings and meet various high profile clients. This was meant to imitate the real experiences faced by international models working abroad.

Cast

Contestants
(Ages stated are at start of contest)

Judges
Anouk Smulders (host)
Sabine Geurten  
Sharon Mor Yosef

Other cast members
 Fred van Leer

Episodes

Call-out order

 The contestant was in the top five/four of the week and won a place in the Basic-Plus apartment/the contestant won best photo
 The contestant was eliminated
 The contestant was immune from elimination
 The contestant won the competition

 The beginning of episode 1 saw the judges visit each of the twelve finalists in their hometowns to tell them they had made it into the competition.
 In episode 1, the safe contestants were declared safe in no particular order. It was revealed which contestants would stay in the Basic-Plus apartment the following episode.
 In episode 2, Daelorian entered the competition as a result of having won the Sizz Wildcard contest.
 In episodes 2 to 6, the contestants were called forward individually in no particular order and told whether they were safe or in danger of elimination.
 In episode 7, Bo, Anke and Nikki advanced to the final. The following episode, it was announced that Daelorian had been chosen by the public as the fourth finalist.

|LineColor        = lightgray
}}
}}

Notes

Call-out order

 The contestant was eliminated
 The contestant was immune from elimination
 The contestant won the competition

 The beginning of episode 1 saw the judges visit each of the twelve finalists in their hometowns to tell them they had made it into the competition.
 In episode 1, the safe contestants were declared safe in no particular order. It was revealed which contestants would stay in the Basic-Plus apartment the following episode.
 In episode 2, Daelorian entered the competition as a result of having won the Sizz Wildcard contest.
 In episodes 2 to 6, the contestants were called forward individually in no particular order and told whether they were safe or in danger of elimination.
 In episode 7, Bo, Anke and Nikki advanced to the final. The following episode, it was announced that Daelorian had been chosen by the public as the fourth finalist.

References

External links
Official RTL5 website

Holland's Next Top Model
2013 Dutch television seasons